Ella Dzelzainis lectures in nineteenth-century literature and is the Postgraduate Research Director for the School of English at Newcastle University.

Dzelzainis is an advisory editor for Oxford Bibliographies and is on the editorial boards of the Gaskell Journal on "Interdisciplinary Studies in the Long Nineteenth Century", and the journal Victorians: A Journal of Culture and Literature.

In December 2016, Dzelzainis was part of the expert panel on the life of the claimed first female sociologist Harriet Martineau, on BBC Radio 4's In Our Time.

Selected publications

References 

Academics of Newcastle University
British women academics
British women historians
Living people
Year of birth missing (living people)